The New South Wales Minister for Planning is a minister in the Government of New South Wales with responsibility for regional and urban planning with the goal of facilitating sustainable growth and employment in New South Wales, Australia.

The current Minister for Planning is Anthony Roberts, who is also the Minister for Homes, and was sworn in on 21 December 2021. The minister is supported in the administration of his portfolio by the following ministers, all sworn in on 21 December 2021:
 the Minister for Lands and Water, currently Kevin Anderson, who is also the Minister for Hospitality and Racing;
 the Minister for Environment and Heritage, currently James Griffin; and
 the Minister for Local Government, currently Wendy Tuckerman.

The ministers administer the portfolios through the Planning and Environment cluster, in particular through the Department of Planning and Environment, a department of the Government of New South Wales, and additional agencies.

Ultimately the ministers are responsible to the Parliament of New South Wales.

List of ministers
The following individuals have been appointed as Minister for Planning, or similar titles.

Former ministerial titles

Public Works

Assistant Ministers for Planning
The following individuals have been appointed as Assistant Minister for Planning, or similar titles.

See also

 List of New South Wales government agencies

References

External links 
New South Wales Department of Planning and Environment

Planning